Donald Kerslake (born 6 August 1980 in Samoa) was a Samoan rugby union player. His playing position was prop. He was selected to represent Samoa at the 2007 Rugby World Cup, however he withdrew with injury before the tournament began. He made 9 appearances for Samoa over the course of his career, and became a district court judge following retirement.

He is the son of former Samoan Cabinet Minister and President of the lands and Titles Court Tuala Tagaloa Sale Kerslake.

Reference list

External links
itsrugby.co.uk profile

1980 births
Samoan rugby union players
Samoa international rugby union players
Living people
Rugby union props
Samoan judges